Neurotoxicity Research is a peer-reviewed academic journal covering the study of neurotoxins. It was established in 1999 and is published eight times per year by Springer Science+Business Media. It is the official journal of the Neurotoxicity Society. The editor-in-chief is Richard M. Kostrzewa (East Tennessee State University). According to the Journal Citation Reports, the journal has a 2014 impact factor of 3.538.

References

External links

Toxicology journals
Neuroscience journals
Springer Science+Business Media academic journals
Publications established in 1999
English-language journals
8 times per year journals